The discography of South Korean singer Wheesung consists of six studio albums, six extended plays, and nine singles.

Studio albums

Extended plays

Singles

As lead artist

As featured artist

Soundtrack appearances

Music videos

Lyrics and compositions

Korea Music Copyright Association

2001 - 2005

2006 - 2010

2011 - 2015

2016 - 2019

References

Discographies of South Korean artists
Pop music discographies
Rhythm and blues discographies